The Sino-Nepalese War, also known as the Sino-Gorkha war and in Chinese the campaign of Gorkha, was an invasion of Tibet by Nepal from 1788 to 1792. The war was initially fought between Nepalese Gorkhas and Tibetan armies over a trade dispute related to a long-standing problem of low-quality coins manufactured by Nepal for Tibet. The Nepalese Army under Bahadur Shah plundered Tibet under Qing rule and Tibetans tamangs signed the Treaty of Kerung paying annual tribute to Nepal. However, Tibetans requested for Chinese intervention and Sino-Tibetan forces under Fuk'anggan raided Nepal up to Nuwakot only to face a strong Nepalese counterattack. Thus, both countries signed the Treaty of Betrawati as a stalemate. The war ended in Nepal accepting terms dictated by China. Nepal became a tribute state of Qing (Nepal maintains diplomacy and pays tribute). Nepal paid tribute to China in 1792, 1794, 1795, 1823, 1842 and 1865. Both Nepal and Tibet had also agreed to accepting the suzerainty of the Qing emperor.

Background
Tibet had been using Nepalese silver coins since the time of the Malla kings. When Prithvi Narayan Shah of the Gorkha Kingdom launched an economic blockade on the Kathmandu Valley during his unification campaign, Jaya Prakash Malla of Kathmandu faced an economic crisis which he tried to alleviate by minting low quality coins mixed with copper. After Prithvi Narayan Shah successfully conquered the Kathmandu Valley in 1769 and firmly established the rule of the Shah dynasty in Nepal, he reverted to minting pure silver coins. But by then the damage to the confidence of the Nepalese minted coins had already been done. The Tibetans demanded that all the impure coins in circulation be replaced by pure silver ones, a demand that would place a huge financial burden on the newly founded Shah dynasty. Prithvi Narayan Shah was not willing to bear such a huge loss in a matter for which he was not responsible, but was willing to vouch for the purity of the newly minted coins. Thus two kinds of coins were in circulation in the market. The case remained unresolved due to his untimely demise in 1775, and the problem was inherited by successive rulers of Nepal.

By 1788 Bahadur Shah, the youngest son of Prithivi Narayan Shah, and the uncle and regent of the minor king Rana Bahadur Shah, had inherited an aggravated coinage problem. On the plea of debased coins, Tibet had started to spread rumors that it was in a position to attack Nepal; and the Nepalese merchants in Tibet were likewise harassed. Another sore point in Nepal-Tibet relationship was Nepal's decision to provide refuge to the 10th Shamarpa Lama, Mipam Chödrup Gyamtso, and his fourteen Tibetan followers. He had fled from Tibet to Nepal on religious and political grounds. Yet another cause for conflict was the low quality of salt being provided by Tibetans to Nepal, since in those days, all the salt in Nepal came from Tibet. A Nepalese delegation was sent to Tibet to resolve these issues, but the demands made by the Nepalese were rejected by the Tibetans. The Nepalese found the quarrel over coinage a good pretext to expand their kingdom and to raid the rich monasteries in Tibet. Thus, Nepal launched multi-directional attacks on Tibet.

First Invasion

In the year 1788, Bahadur Shah sent Gorkha troops under the joint command of Damodar Pande and Bam Shah to attack Tibet. The Gorkha troops entered Tibet through Kuti (Nyalam Town) and reached as far as Tashilhunpo (about 410 km. from Kuti). A fierce battle was fought at Shikarjong in which the Tibetans were badly defeated. The Panchen Lama and Sakya Lama then requested the Gorkha troops to have peace talks. So the Gorkha troops left Shikarjong and went towards Kuti and Kerung (Gyirong).

When the Qianlong Emperor of China heard the news of the invasion of Tibet by Nepal, he sent a large troop of the Chinese army under the command of General Chanchu. Chanchu came to know the situation from the Tibetan Lamas. He decided to stay in Tibet till the dispute was settled.

The representatives of Tibet and Nepal met at Khiru in 1789 to have peace talks. In the talks Tibet was held responsible for the quarrel and were required to give compensation to Nepal for the losses incurred in the war. Tibet had also to pay tribute to Nepal a sum of Rs. 50,001 every year in return for giving back to Tibet all the territories acquired during the war. It was called the Treaty of Kerung. The Nepalese representatives were given Rs. 50,001 as the first installment. So giving back the territories - Kerung, Kuti, Longa, Jhunga and Falak, they went back to Nepal. But Tibet refused to pay the tributes after the first year of the conclusion of the treaty. As a result, the war between Nepal and Tibet continued.

Second Invasion
As Tibet had refused to pay the tribute to Nepal, Bahadur Shah sent a troop under Abhiman Singh Basnet to Kerung and another troop under the command of Damodar Pande to Kuti in 1791. Damodar Pande attacked Digarcha and captured the property of the monastery there. He also arrested the minister of Lhasa, Dhoren Kazi (Tib. Rdo ring Bstan 'dzin dpal 'byor, b.1760)  and came back to Nepal. As soon as this news was heard by the Qianlong Emperor, he sent a strong troop of 70,000 soldiers under the leadership of Fuk'anggan to defend Tibet.

The Qing Empire asked Nepal to return the property to Tibet which was looted at Digarcha. They also demanded them to give back Shamarpa Lama who had taken asylum in Nepal. But Nepal turned a deaf ear to these demands. The Qing imperial army responded to Nepal with military intervention. The Qing forces marched along the banks of the Trishuli River until they reached Nuwakot. The Nepalese troops attempted to defend against the Qing attack, but were already faced with overwhelming odds. Heavy damage was inflicted on both sides and the Chinese army pushed the Gurkhas back to the inner hills close to the Nepali capital. However, a comprehensive defeat of the Gorkhali army could not be achieved.

At the same time, Nepal was dealing with military confrontations along two other fronts. The nation of Sikkim had begun incursions along Nepal's eastern border. Along the far-western side, the war with Garhwal continued. Within Nepal's own borders, the kingdoms of Achham, Doti and Jumla openly revolted. Thus the problems that Bahadur Shah faced made it much harder to defend against the Qing army. The anxious Bahadur Shah asked for ten artillery guns from the East India Company. Captain William Kirkpatrick arrived in Kathmandu, but he informed the Nepalese the conditions of business treaty which he required the signing of before delivery of the weapons. Wary of what signing the treaty would entail, the deal fell through and the military situation became critical for Bahadur Shah.

After a series of successful battles by Qing, the Qing army had finally suffered a major setback when they tried to cross a monsoon-flooded Betrawati, close to a Gorkhali palace in Nuwakot. As the Qing troops had reached south of the Betravati river, near Nuwakot, it was difficult for the Nepalese troops to wait for them at Kathmandu. At Kathmandu, a Nepalese force of less than 200 soldiers attempted to resist the Qing troops at Betravati. On September 19, 1792, Nepalese troops launched a counterattack against the Qing forces encamped at Jitpurfedi. The Nepalese used a tactic where their soldiers carried lit torches in their hands, tying them to the branches of trees, and tying flaming torches on the horns of domestic animals and driving them towards the enemy. The Qing army suffered a defeat, but the loss failed to dislodge them from Nepal.

A stalemate ensued, and with their resources low and a looming uncertainty regarding how long they would be able to hold on in addition to the need to continue their expansion drive on the western frontier, the Gorkhalis signed a treaty on terms dictated by the Qing that required, among other obligations, Nepal to send tributes to the Qing emperor every five years.

On the 8th day of Bhadra, 10,000 Chinese troops advanced forward from Betrawati river. There were three forts past the Betrawati river namely; Chokde, Dudethumko, and Gerkhu. At Gerkhu, the commanding officer was Kaji Kirtiman Singh Basnyat and at Chokde, the commanding officer was Kaji Damodar Pande. There were serious fightings around all the three forts and heavy repulse from Nepalese forces compelled Chinese troops to retreat to Betrawati river. At Betrawati bridge, the Chinese General Tung Thyang began to punish retreating Chinese soldiers with severe injuries resulting in their death. Two of the Chinese officers who retreated beyond the Betrawati river were punished with injury to their nose. The action of the Chinese General demotivated the troops and increase rapid desertion and retreat through other routes. Many Chinese troops died falling from hills into river and others from the bullets and arrows from Nepalese side. Around 1000 or 1200 Chinese troops were killed in the manner. The Chinese General Tung Thyang lost all hopes of attacking the Nepalese forces and decided to conclude a treaty with Nepal through his letter. The letter from Tung Thyang reached the government of Nepal. In reply, the government of Nepal issued a royal order deputing Kaji Damodar Pande to conclude a treaty with the Chinese Emperor to prevent further hostility and maintain peace with the Emperor. The royal order issued by King Rana Bahadur Shah to Kaji Damodar Pande on Thursday, Bhadra Sudi 13, 1849 (September 1792) is detailed below:

Aftermath

The Qing general Fuk'anggan then sent a proposal to the Government of Nepal for ratifying a peace treaty. Bahadur Shah also wanted to have cordial relations with the Qing. He readily accepted the proposal and they concluded a friendly treaty at Betravati on 2 October 1792. The terms of the treaty were as follows:

 Both Nepal and Tibet will accept the suzerainty of the Qing emperor.
 The Government of Tibet will pay the compensation of the property of the Nepalese merchants which were looted by the Tibetans at Lhasa.
 The Nepali citizens will have the right to visit, trade, and establish industries in any part of Tibet and China.
 In case of any dispute between Nepal and Tibet, the Qing government will intervene and settle the dispute at the request of both the countries.
 The Qing will help Nepal defend against any external aggression.
 Both Nepal and Tibet will have to send a delegation to pay tribute to the Imperial Court in China every five years.
 In return, the Qing emperor will also send friendly gifts to both the countries and the people who carry the tribute will be treated as important guests and will be provided every facility.

While Tibet came under greater control of the Qing after the war, Nepal still retained its autonomy, but had to subordinate to Qing dynasty terms and present tribute to China every 5 year. However the weakening of the Qing dynasty during the 19th century led to the disregard of this treaty. For instance, during the Anglo-Nepalese War of 1814–16, when the East India Company launched an invasion of Nepal, not only did China fail to help her feudatory in that conflict, but it also failed to prevent the cession of Nepalese territory to the Company. Similarly, during another Nepalese-Tibetan War of 1855–56, China was conspicuously absent. The Qing were not particularly interested in ruling Nepal; their war was primarily aimed at consolidating their control of Tibet which, in turn, was related to military strategy throughout Central Asia.

After the 3rd Nepalese-Tibetan war, the Treaty of Thapathali had been made. The first attempt of the treaty failed with China. The second term of treaty succeeded with all side agreeing. The Nepalese paid their last tribute in 1865 and ended any form of submission to China. Although both Tibet and Nepal agreed to still regard the Chinese Emperor as their sovereign.

Owing to their ethnic ties to Tibet, the Bhutia and Tamang communities of Nepal suffered discrimination as a consequence of Nepal's wars against Tibet.

Subsequent attitude 
Later Prime Minister Bhimsen Thapa expressed his attitude on the Sino-Nepalese War in a letter to King Girvan Yuddha Bikram Shah. He wrote,

Gallery

See also 
Tibet under Qing rule
Ten Great Campaigns
Golden Urn
Nepalese–Tibetan War
Treaty of Thapathali

References

Citations

Sources

Further reading 
 Wright, Daniel, History of Nepal. New Delhi-Madras, Asian Educational Services, 1990

External links 
 The History of Nepal: Expansion of Nepal
 History of Nepalese Army: Nepal-Tibet War

Conflicts in 1789
Conflicts in 1790
Conflicts in 1791
Conflicts in 1792
Wars involving Tibet
Wars involving Nepal
Wars involving the Qing dynasty
China–Nepal relations
18th century in Tibet
18th century in Nepal
1789 in China
1790 in China
1791 in China
1792 in China
Gurkhas
Invasions of Tibet
1789 in Nepal
1790 in Nepal
1791 in Nepal
1792 in Nepal